The National Ballistics Intelligence Service, or NABIS, is a British intelligence service dedicated to managing and providing detailed information regarding firearm-related criminality. The service aims to use its database to store ballistics information about police cases involving firearms, and consequently maintain it for future use and reference. The service operates four facilities to test and analyse firearms evidence to help link it with other cases. These are based in Birmingham, London and Manchester.

The service was officially launched on 1 April 2008 and can be roughly compared to the Integrated Ballistics Identification System operating in the United States.

Four regional forensic hubs operate within four host forces/organisations: Greater Manchester Police (GMP), West Midlands Police (WMP), Metropolitan Police Service (MPS) and the Glasgow unit of SPA Forensic Services. The staff are around 40 in number.

See also
 British intelligence agencies
 National Police Chiefs' Council
 Police National Computer
 United Kingdom National DNA Database
 Bureau of Alcohol, Tobacco, Firearms and Explosives(ATF) - USA

References

External links
 Official NABIS website

2008 establishments in the United Kingdom
Government agencies established in 2008
Home Office (United Kingdom)
National law enforcement agencies of the United Kingdom
Organisations based in Birmingham, West Midlands